A swing yarder is a mobile piece of heavy duty forestry equipment used for pulling logs from the woods to a logging road with cables.  The swing yarder is also known as a grapple yarder.

In any logging operation, it is necessary to transport the harvested tree from the stump to a landing for transport to market (usually on a truck). If the ground is relatively flat it may be possible to transport the tree or logs cut from the tree on a wheeled or tracked machine. However if the ground is too steep for the operation of such machinery, it is common practice to rig some sort of a cable system for moving the wood.  The swing yarder is one of several varieties of machines that have been used for this purpose. 

The swing yarder has several drums to pull in the cables. The cables run up an angled boom and then to the far side of a setting.  By using two cables set up like a clothes line, the rigging can be pulled out and logs can be pulled across a logging setting where the trees have been previously felled.  This machine is most suitable for steep ground where it is difficult to access the logs with other machinery.  Swing yarders can also be used in flatter areas with lighter loads.

While there are various rigging options, the most common one uses a grapple that can be lowered onto a logs and closed via the cable system.  Using a grapple avoids the need for people in the setting to attach chokers to the log.  Choker setting as a profession is a very dangerous occupation.

The main difference between a swing yarder and a tower yarder is that the upperworks is mounted on a large slewing bearing.  This bearing permits the boom and cable system to be 'swung' across a setting without relocating the machine.  An experienced operator uses timing and cable tension to swing the grapple to the desired location. In practice, however, the main benefit of a swinging machine is that once the logs are yarded up to the machine, they can be swung to the side and landed. This allows the machine to be positioned in a small area such as on a road, and to land (set down) the logs on the road behind (or in front of) the machine.  By contrast a tower has no options on where to set the logs---so the tower has to be positioned back from the break of the hill so as to leave a landing area on the downhill side of the machine, the logs can only be pulled up to near the tower and then lowered to the ground making it necessary for a shovel (log loader) to also be present to remove the logs once landed. Implicitly a swing machine does not need to be as tall as a tower machine particularly in steep ground because the swing machine can be set right up to the 'edge' of the steep ground while the tower must be set back from the 'edge' to allow landing space.

External links
Washington TL-6 Swing yarder

Log transport
Forestry equipment